Alexandre Faioli (born 22 November 1983) is a Brazilian footballer.

Biography
Born in Vila Velha, Espírito Santo state, Faioli started his career at Desportiva Capixaba. After a brief spells with Palmeiras B, he returned to Espírito Santo and winning the league of the state 3 times, with Serra FC. He also played in national level (Campeonato Brasileiro Série C) in 2005 season.

In November 2005 he was signed by Americano in 2-year contract.

Vasco
In April 2006 he was signed by the major club of Rio de Janeiro – Vasco in 3-year deal. After a handful appearances, he was loaned to Madureira, another team from the city of RJ in March 2007. In May, he left for Vitória of Bahia state. He left for Boavista SC along with Roberto Lopes to play at 2008 League of Rio de Janeiro state before returned to Vasco in 2008. He only played once for Vasco at Campeonato Brasileiro Série A that season, which Vasco relegated to Série B.

In 2009 season he played a few games for the team at 2009 League of Rio de Janeiro state and signed a new deal until end of season in May. but in July left for Portuguese Primeira Liga side Leixões.

Leixões & Duque de Caxias
With Leixões he played 8 league matches at 2009–10 Primeira Liga. After played a Taça da Liga match in January 2010, he returned to Rio de Janeiro for Duque de Caxias in a 3-month contract.

Career statistics

1 No stats. available for Campeonato Paulista Série A3
2 No stats. available for Campeonato Capixaba
3 No stats. available for Campeonato Carioca
4 He joined the team after the team eliminated from 2007 Copa do Brasil
5 9 games and 2 goals in 2009 Campeonato Carioca
6 9 games and 1 goal in 2010 Campeonato Carioca
7 See note 1 to 6 (except 4)

Honours
Espírito Santo State League: 2003, 2004, 2005

References

External links
 
 Portuguese Liga Profile at LPFP.pt 
 
 
 Net Vasco Profile 
 
 GloboEsporte Profile 
 bloomsoccer.com.br  
 crvascodagama.com 

Brazilian footballers
Desportiva Ferroviária players
Sociedade Esportiva Palmeiras players
Americano Futebol Clube players
CR Vasco da Gama players
Madureira Esporte Clube players
Esporte Clube Vitória players
Boavista Sport Club players
Leixões S.C. players
Duque de Caxias Futebol Clube players
Brazilian expatriate footballers
Expatriate footballers in Portugal
Brazilian expatriate sportspeople in Portugal
Primeira Liga players
Association football wingers
People from Vila Velha
1983 births
Living people
Sportspeople from Espírito Santo